Kadha Thudarunnu is a 2010 Malayalam-language drama film written and directed by Sathyan Anthikad. The film stars Jayaram, Mamta Mohandas, Baby Anikha and Asif Ali .

Kadha Thudarunnu was Sathyan Anthikad's fiftieth film as a director and it was also the debut production of TrueLine Cinema's Thankachan Emmanuel.

Plot 
Vidya Lakshmi (Mamta Mohandas), scion of a rich Hindu aristocratic family marries Shanavas (Asif Ali), a Muslim, against the diktats of both the families. Though happily married, their life is difficult. Few years pass by and the couple now has a daughter Laya (Baby Anikha), who is now in nursery. Despite strong financial troubles, Shanavas does his best to support his family. One rainy night, on his way to purchase mangoes for his daughter, some goons kill Shanavas, having mistaken him for someone else. Having nowhere to go, Vidyalakshmi tries her best to take care of her daughter. But the financial troubles force her to reduce her daily expenses, including the school bus for her daughter. Within a short time, she is asked to vacate the house, as there has been a long delay in payment of rent. Vidya Lakshmi, with nowhere to go, decides to sleep on Kozhikode Railway platform with her daughter. One fine morning, she catches an auto to drop her kid at school. Preman (Jayaram), the auto driver is a talkative and simple chap, with a sense of humor. But after traveling, she gets out of the auto and escapes without paying the cash. The next day, Preman finds her at the railway station, and when the fare is demanded, she explains her story to him, which makes him feel sympathetic to her. He brings Vidyalakshmi and her daughter to his colony. Vidya Lakshmi, within a short time, captures the hearts of the people at the colony. When Preman learns she was doing her MBBS when she married and had to give up studies after that, he advises her to sit for the final year exam. With the support of the colony residents, Vidyalakshmi does the MBBS examination and becomes a doctor. Her daughter, one day comes in contact with Shanavas' mother, who now wants her granddaughter returned. But Vidyalakshmi politely refuses. The elder brother of Shanavas then threatens her with the support of Moulavi, but Preman intervenes and forces them to go back. With the help of her friend, Vidhyalakkshmi gets a job in Kuwait and though not willing, she accepts it. She leaves for Kuwait with her daughter, promising to come back soon. Preman later sees an astrologer who says he has a chance of going abroad. Later Preman is seen waiting at the beach, looking for the next news from Vidyalakshmi.

Cast

Jayaram as Preman
Mamta Mohandas as Vidyalakshmi
Baby Anika Surendran as Laya
Asif Ali as Shanavas Ahammed aka Shanu
Innocent as Lasar, a lottery agent
Amith as Shahid
Mamukkoya as Mamachan
K.P.A.C.Lalitha as Omanakkunjamma
Chembil Ashokan as Narayanan
Shantha Kumari as Nancy, Lazar's wife
Lakshmi Priya as Mallika
Sreejith Ravi as Ratheesh
Vettukili Prakash as Venkiti
Manu Jose
Shruthy Menon as Deepa
Reshmi Boban as Razia
Manjusha Sajish as Usha
Sreedevi Unni as Shanavas' mother
Murali Mohan as Swaminathan, Vidyalakshmi's father
Deepika Mohan as Vidyalakshmi's mother
Praveen Prem as Harichandran
Ullas as Unni
Kalamandalam Radhika as Principal

Production
Jayaram  signed to play the main role. Anthikkad approached Vidya Balan to play the lead female role, but she could not take on the role of deadline issues.Meera Jasmine, who played a leading role in Sathyan's four back to back films came up, but finally Mamta Mohandas was signed to play the lead female role, this film became a turning point in her career.

Awards
 Kerala State Film Awards
 Second Best Actress - Mamta Mohandas

 13th Asianet Film Awards
 Best Screenplay - Sathyan Anthikad
 Best Cinematographer - Venu
 Best Lead Actor - Jayaram
 Best Supporting Actress - Lakshmi Priya
 Best Character Actor - Innocent
 Most Popular Actress - Mamta Mohandas
 Best Child Artist (Female) - Baby Anikha
 Best Male Playback Singer - Hariharan

Filmfare Awards
Best Actress - Mamta Mohandas
Best Male Playback Singer - Hariharan - "Aaro Padunnu"

Soundtrack

The soundtrack for the film was composed by veteran composer Ilaiyaraaja, with lyrics penned by Vayalar Sarath Chandra Varma.

References

External links 
 
 
 Kadha Thudarunnu at Malayalam Movies

2010 films
2010s Malayalam-language films
Films with screenplays by Sathyan Anthikad
Indian interfaith romance films
Indian family films
Films about widowhood in India
Films shot in Kozhikode
Films directed by Sathyan Anthikad
Films scored by Ilaiyaraaja